Rudzica may refer to the following places in Poland:
 Rudzica, Greater Poland Voivodeship (west-central Poland)
 Rudzica, Lower Silesian Voivodeship (south-west Poland)
 Rudzica, Silesian Voivodeship (south Poland)